The 1970 NCAA University Division Swimming and Diving Championships were contested in March 1970 at the Ute Natatorium at the University of Utah in Salt Lake City, Utah at the 47th annual NCAA-sanctioned swim meet to determine the team and individual national champions of University Division men's collegiate swimming and diving in the United States.

Indiana again topped the team standings, the Hoosiers' third overall title.

Team standings
Note: Top 10 only
(H) = Hosts
Full results

See also
List of college swimming and diving teams

References

NCAA Division I Men's Swimming and Diving Championships
NCAA University Division Swimming And Diving Championships
NCAA University Division Swimming And Diving Championships